Laith Nobari or Laith Naseri (born 23 September 1977 in Baghdad, Iraq) is an Iraq-born Moaved Iranian retired football player who has played for Persepolis and has represented Iran national football team.

Club career

Club career statistics

References

External Links 

Laith Nobari at Tehran Football Committee

Iraqi emigrants to Iran
Sportspeople from Baghdad
Iranian footballers
Iranian expatriate footballers
Persepolis F.C. players
Pas players
Saham SC players
1977 births
Living people
Iran international footballers
Association football forwards
Iranian expatriates in Oman